Ghar Ghar Ki Kahani ((Translation|The story of every home}}) is a 1970 Hindi-language drama film directed by T. Prakash Rao. The film stars Balraj Sahni, Nirupa Roy and Om Prakash in lead roles, supported by Rakesh Roshan, Bharathi, Shashikala and others.The remake and adaptation rights of this film are now owned by Glamour Eyes Films.

Plot 

Shankarnath (Balraj Sahni) is an honest Government employee, while his subordinate Sadhuram (Om Prakash) is a corrupt employee. Shankarnath, even though employed in a supervisory capacity, nets only Rs.630/-, and hence is unable to accede to any of the demands placed by his three school-going children, Ravi, Roopa, and Raja. When the trio declares a hunger-fast until their demands are met, he decides to let them run the household expenses, for a period of six months, by giving Ravi his entire salary. Ravi thinks that he can save a lot of money and get stuff for himself and his siblings - but things go seriously wrong when Raja loses money while gambling; relatives descend on them during Diwali; cash is stolen; and his mother, Padma (Nirupa Roy), becomes seriously ill.

Cast
 Rakesh Roshan as Suresh 
 Bharathi as Seema
 Balraj Sahni as Shankarnath
 Nirupa Roy as Padma
 Om Prakash as Sadhuram
 Shashikala as Jamna
 Gajanan Jagirdar as Padma's Brother
 Sulochana Chatterjee as Suresh's Mother
 Jagdeep as Surendra
 Shabnam as Surendra's Wife
 Maruti as Panduram 
 Praveen Paul as Gopi's Mother
 Jalal Agha as College Student
 Mahesh Kothare as	Ravi
 Neetu Singh as Roopa 
 Master Ripple as Raja
 Mehmood Jr. as Gopi 
 Birbal as	Shankarnath's Subordinate

Soundtrack

External links

References 

1970 films
1970s Hindi-language films
1970 drama films
Films scored by Kalyanji Anandji
Films directed by T. Prakash Rao